The Cleveland Rugby League are an American professional rugby league football club based in Cleveland, Ohio. They are a founding member of the new North American Rugby League that will begin in 2022.

History
The Cleveland Rugby League team were first established in 2018 by Toronto Wolfpack trialist, Monte Gaddis. Initially they planned to start the Midwest Rugby League Conference where they would play a rugby league 9s game against the Chicago Stockyarders.

Cleveland's first match was against USA Rugby League club, the Northern Virginia Eagles.

On 31 March 2021 it was announced a new professional North American Rugby League competition with 14 teams taking part, including Cleveland Rugby League.

On 19 April 2021 it was announced that experienced Australian coach Glenn Morrison had been appointed as Director of Rugby; Morrison has previously been head coach at Dewsbury Rams, in the RFL Championship and the Jamaican national team.

Players

Current squad
2021 NARL season squad;
Cory Graham
Dayne Karlovec
Brent Coles
Zack Forro
Ve'shaun Glover
Daejon Street
Monte Gaddis
Jonathan Torres
Lee Cundiff
Jalen Peeples
Devin Karlovec
Justin Rutledge

References

External links
 

American rugby league teams
Rugby clubs established in 2018
2018 establishments in Ohio
Sports teams in Cleveland
USA Rugby League teams
Proposed sports teams